Mikuláš Bek (born 22 April 1964) is a Czech musicologist and politician who has been serving as Minister of EU Affairs in Petr Fiala's Cabinet since December 2021.

Early career
From 2011 to 2019 he served as rector of Masaryk University in Brno, succeeding his friend and future cabinet superior Petr Fiala.

Political career
Since 2018 Bek has been a member of the Czech Senate representing the Brno-City electoral district, as a nominee of the Mayors and Independents. In the Senate, he chaired the Committee on EU Affairs. In November 2021, he stated that the Visegrád Group is overrated and that he wants to focus on cooperation with Germany and the Western European countries.

References

1964 births
Living people
Members of the Senate of the Czech Republic
Mayors and Independents Senators
Government ministers of the Czech Republic
Mayors and Independents Government ministers
People from Šternberk
Masaryk University alumni
Charles University alumni